Willow Vale is a Northern Village of the Southern Highlands of New South Wales, Australia, in Wingecarribee Shire. It is located 2 km north of Mittagong and is often considered part of Braemar along with its neighbour Balaclava. 

At the 2021 census, 826 people were living at Willow Vale.

Notes and references

Towns of the Southern Highlands (New South Wales)
Wingecarribee Shire